KJNT (1490 AM) is a radio station licensed to cover Jackson, Wyoming, United States. The station is currently owned by Ted W. Austin, Jr.

References

External links

JNT
Radio stations established in 2011
2011 establishments in Wyoming